A self-cleaning floor is a floor surface that reduces the amount of chemicals needed by absorbing into itself through special pods automated to dispose of the water four times a day. Such floors are meant for use in hospitals, washrooms and other places. In Europe and few African countries, many leading ceramic tiles and sanitary ware manufacturers have products on the market with self cleaning features.

Industrial applications

Hospitals
The Grabo Silver Knight resilient floor covering is the first photocatalytic self-disinfecting surface. Its self-disinfecting property is provided by the double-defense line constituted by Nano-Silver and Nano-TiO2 particles. This product is targeted towards the health sector, aiding in preventing the spread of infection in hospitals.

Dairy
The Cozy Floor by Blue Diamond Industries, LLC is a self supported, self cleaning hot water heated floor system, designed to eliminate the use of bedding under calves.

Food processing facilities
The SunWash self-cleaning floor coatings provide a washable finish and are developed to withstand the high traffic and humid conditions such as those present in food processing facilities.

Food service
Mechline Developments’ Sani-Floor consists of a suction pump and automatic waste lifting. The system can be installed in any food production area to take care of spills hygienically and safely.

Public restrooms
Many public toilets, such as the Sanisette, have utilized self-cleaning floor mechanisms.

Conceptual designs
The Smart-Floor is a concept designed by Svetozar Belogrozdev of Swansea Metropolitan University. It is a self-cleaning floor design which is intended to prevent dust and dirt from settling. Regulated vacuums cycle through the floor constantly while intelligent pressure sensors detect if there is anything in the room and automatically regulate the vacuum going through the tiles. The Smart-Floor one of the six UK designs that won the top 100 designs in Electrolux Design Lab 2013.

Another approach to self-cleaning floors involves the use of central vacuum systems beneath micro perforated raised floor tiles to allow a small negative pressure to be pulled so that all dust and dirt are automatically collected.

See also
 Self-cleaning glass
 Self-cleaning oven
  Self-cleaning toilet seat
 Robotic vacuum cleaner
 Central vacuum cleaner

References

Floors
Cleaning
Home
Building materials
Structural system